Hassen Moussa (born 14 January 1973) is a Tunisian judoka. He competed at the 1996 Summer Olympics and the 2000 Summer Olympics.

References

External links

1973 births
Living people
Tunisian male judoka
Judoka at the 1996 Summer Olympics
Judoka at the 2000 Summer Olympics
Olympic judoka of Tunisia
African Games medalists in judo
Competitors at the 1995 All-Africa Games
Competitors at the 1999 All-Africa Games
Competitors at the 2003 All-Africa Games
African Games gold medalists for Tunisia
African Games bronze medalists for Tunisia
20th-century Tunisian people
21st-century Tunisian people